Sing for You is the fourth extended play by South Korean–Chinese boy band Exo. It was released by SM Entertainment in Korean and Chinese versions on December 10, 2015. The album held the record as the fastest selling album in the history of South Korean album sales chart Hanteo, until it was overtaken by Exo's third studio album Ex'Act in June 2016. It is the first Exo record to not feature Tao, as he filed a lawsuit against SM Entertainment and left the group in August 2015.

Background and release
On November 24, 2015, Exo was confirmed to be releasing their second winter special album, after Miracles in December (2013). Teaser images for the album began to be released from December 2. The album's track list, including four new songs and a bonus track "Lightsaber", previously released as a single in November, was announced on December 7. Finally, the mini-album was released digitally and physically on December 10.

Promotion
On December 10, 2015, shortly after Sing for You was released, Exo held a showcase with an audience of 1,500 to promote the album at Lotte World in Seoul. The showcase was live streamed using the mobile application V Live and afterwards set the record as the most-watched live stream ever on the application. Exo began performing the songs "Sing for You" and "Unfair" on Korean music shows from December 12 and 18 respectively. They also added these songs to the setlist of their second solo concert tour The Exo'luxion starting from the Singapore show on January 9, 2016.

Singles
On November 4, 2015, Exo was announced to be releasing "Lightsaber", a promotional song for the movie Star Wars: The Force Awakens in South Korea, as part of the collaboration project between SM Entertainment and Walt Disney. A teaser video for the song was released on November 8, followed by its music video and digital release on November 11. "Lightsaber" was later announced to be included in Sing for You as a bonus track on December 7. Exo performed the song for the first time at the 17th Mnet Asian Music Awards. The song peaked at number 9 on Gaon's digital chart.

A teaser video for the album's title song "Sing for You" was released on December 8. The song was released along with the EP as well as its music videos on December 10. It peaked at number 3 on Gaon's digital chart and achieved "triple crown", winning first place three times on KBS's weekly music show Music Bank.

Commercial performance
Both versions combined, Sing for You broke the record  previously held by Exodus, Exo's second studio album, as the album with the biggest first-week sales recorded by the Korean album sales monitoring website Hanteo with over 267,900 copies. Individually, the album's Korean and Chinese versions debuted at number 1 and 2 respectively on both Gaon's weekly and monthly album charts, and later landed at number 2 and 7 respectively on its yearly album chart for 2015.

Track listing
Credits adapted from Naver.

Charts

Korean and Chinese versions

Combined version

Sales

Awards and nominations

Music program awards

Release history

References

External links

2015 EPs
SM Entertainment EPs
Genie Music EPs
Korean-language EPs
Chinese-language EPs
Mandopop EPs
Exo EPs